Nick Rodriguez (born August 30, 1996) is an American professional submission grappler, Brazilian jiu-jitsu (BJJ) practitioner and former amateur wrestler.

As a BJJ blue belt Rodriguez won the 2018 World No-Gi Championship then the ADCC West Coast Trials before winning silver at the 2019 ADCC Submission Fighting World Championship and silver at the 2022 edition.

Early life and education
Nicholas Pete Rodriguez was born on 30 August 1996 in Philadelphia, Pennsylvania, raised in Clayton, New Jersey, and attended Clayton High School.

Wrestling career
Rodriguez began wrestling in sixth grade. He qualified for the NJSIAA championships as a senior but did not place.

College career
After high school, Rodriguez attended Ferrum College, that has an NCAA Division III wrestling program. In between his last match as a high school wrestler and his first match as a collegiate wrestler, he gained 50 pounds, bulking up from 170 to 220 pounds. Rodriguez attended college for one year during which he placed fourth at the East Regionals and had a record of 23 wins and 4 losses. He decided to pursue modeling career with Wilhelmina Models and performed very briefly with Chippendales.

USA Wrestling career
Rodriguez returned to wrestling on October 5, 2019, when he faced that year's U.S. Wrestling World Team Member Pat Downey in a super-fight under freestyle rules at Who's Number One. He lost the match by technical fall.

Professional Grappling career

2018
In 2018, Rodriguez was persuaded by a friend to attend his first Jiu-jitsu class to stay fit. After two weeks of training, he attended his first submission wrestling competition and went on to win the advanced 230 pounds and absolute brackets. A few months later, he moved to Renzo Gracie Academy with coach John Danaher, who awarded him his blue belt later on.

After a failed attempt to qualify for the ADCCs, Rodriguez competed at the IBJJF World Championship in the blue belt division. He defeated all three of his opponents to win the championship.

2019
As a blue belt, Rodriguez qualified for the 2019 ADCC World Championships after winning the North American trials. He defeated three notable Brazilian Jiu-Jitsu black belts in Mahamed Aly, Orlando Sanchez (BJJ), and Cyborg Abreu to make it to the finals, where he was downed by IBJJF Black Belt World Champion Kaynan Duarte on points, earning him 2nd place in the tournament.

He then competed against Duarte in a rematch in which he lost. He also competed at the BJJ Fanatics Grand Prix.

2020
After his bronze medal finish at the KASAI Pro 7, Rodriguez was scheduled to face 19' US World Team Member Pat Downey at Third Coast Grappling IV in a special-ruleset match on March 14. However, the event was cancelled due to the COVID-19 pandemic.

He then competed at Third Coast Grappling: Kumite IV on July 11. He was eliminated in the first round.

In December, 2020, Rodriguez moved to Puerto Rico with the rest of his teammates to continue training under John Danaher.

2021

Rodriguez competed against Yuri Simões in the co-main event of Who's Number One on March 26, 2021. Rodriguez won the match by decision. He was then invited to compete in an absolute grand prix at Third Coast Grappling 6 on April 3rd, 2021. Rodriguez defeated Pedro Marinho by decision in the opening round before losing a decision to Victor Hugo in the semi-final.

In July, news broke that the Danaher Death Squad were splitting up. Rodriguez elected to continue training with Craig Jones, Ethan Crelinsten, and Nicky Ryan. The four grapplers opened up a new gym in Austin, Texas under the name B-Team Jiu-Jitsu in August, 2021. Shortly afterward, Rodriguez was invited to compete at the 2022 ADCC World Championship.

On December 30, 2021, Rodriguez competed against UFC veteran Steve Mowry at Fury Pro Grappling 3 and submitted him with a rear-naked choke at 5:30.

2022
Rodriguez faced Elder Cruz at Who's Number One: Jones v Marinho on January 21, 2022 and lost the match by split decision. Shortly after this, Rodriguez was promoted to brown belt in BJJ. Rodriguez competed in the over 99kg division of ADCC 2022, defeating Damon Ramos on points and submitting John Hansen with a rear-naked choke on the first day. On the second day he defeated Felipe Pena on points in the semi-final, but was submitted by Gordon Ryan in the final and came away with a silver medal.

He was then invited to compete at EBI 20: The Absolutes on October 23, 2021. Rodriguez won the tournament by defeating Ezeqiual Zurita, Luke Griffith, Austin Baker, and Kyle Boehm in one night. On December 15, 2021, Rodriguez was scheduled to compete in another absolute tournament at UFC Fight Pass Invitational 3. However, Vinny Magalhães withdrew from the main event match against Gordon Ryan and Rodriguez agreed to step in to replace him instead. Neither man could finish the fight in regulation time and the match went to EBI overtime, where Gordon Ryan won by fastest escape time. Ryan would accuse Rodriguez of 'greasing' during their match. Rodriguez denied that accusation on an episode Mark Bell's Power Project Podcast in February, 2023.

2023
Rodriguez stepped in on two day's notice to replace Gordon Ryan against Felipe Pena in the main event of Who's Number One on February 25, 2023. He lost the match by unanimous decision.

Championships and accomplishments
Main Achievements:
 ADCC US West Coast Trials champion (2019)
 EBI 20: The Absolute Champion (2022)
 Grappling Industries: Wildwook (Advanced Absolute) (2018)
 Grappling Industries: Wildwook (Advanced 230 lbs) (2018)
 2nd Place ADCC World Championships (2019 / 2022)
 Who's Number 1 (Freestyle wrestling Superfight) (2019)
 3rd place Kasai 7 HW Grand Prix (2020)
 3rd place ADCC US East Coast Trials (2018)
 3rd place Third Coast Grappling 6 Grand Prix (2021)
 3rd place KASAI Pro 7 (+99 kg) (2020)

Main Achievements (Colored Belts):
 IBJJF World Championships N0-Gi champion (2018 blue belt)
 High Rollerz Open: Pittsburgh (blue belt Absolute)

Grappling record

References 

American practitioners of Brazilian jiu-jitsu
Living people
American submission wrestlers
American male sport wrestlers
People from Clayton, New Jersey
Sportspeople from Gloucester County, New Jersey
1996 births